Finsterforst is a German folk metal band from Schwarzwald, Baden-Württemberg, whose lyrical themes deal with nature, German myths, and fantasy worlds. Formed in 2004, the group has released five studio albums, one extended play and one compilation album.

Finsterforst means "dark forest" and it is a reference to "Schwarzwald" ("black forest"), a wooded mountain range in the band's home state.

Besides the usual line-up of instruments used in metal (electric guitars, bass, drums), the band's sound relies heavily on accordion melodies, with the occasional use of instruments, such as the tin whistle and the oboe. The band's genre is often dubbed pagan metal because of its use of harsh vocals.

Several Finsterforst members also play in Cryptic Forest, a black-metal band from Schwarzwald, Baden-Württemberg.

History

Formation and Wiege Der Finsternis (2004–2006) 
The band was formed at the end of the year 2004 by Tobias Weinreich, Sebastian "AlleyJazz" Scherrer, Simon Schillinger and Marco Schomas. Because the line-up was not complete, the group decided to focus on songwriting.

Since the band felt it needed a real accordion-player, Johannes Joseph joined the line-up in the spring of 2005, followed by rhythm guitarist David Schuldis in October the same year.

In spite of missing a drummer, the band booked Iguana Studios in Buchheim, Baden-Württemberg, and, at the end of December 2005, three songs were recorded with the help of a drum machine. The songs were released as the Wiege der Finsternis EP in March 2006.

New drummer and Weltenkraft (2006–2008) 
In October 2006, drummer Cornelius "Wombo" Heck joined the line-up, enabling the band to prepare for live shows.

In February and March 2007, the band re-entered Iguana Studios to record its début album, Weltenkraft, which was released in July through World Chaos Productions.

...zum Tode hin, new vocalist and Urwerk (2008–2011) 
The band's second album, ...zum Tode hin was recorded in July 2008 at Iguana Studios and was released through the German label Einheit Produktionen on 27 February 2009.

At the end of November 2009, the band announced the departure of Schomas, and that it was searching for a new singer, a position which was filled by Oliver Berlin in 2010.

In May 2010, the band released Urwerk, a two-disc re-release of its first EP (with a bonus track) and its début album.

Rastlos and record deal with Napalm Records (2012-2015) 
On 28 September 2012, it was confirmed that the band had signed a new record deal with the Austrian record label Napalm Records. On 26 November 2012, the album Rastlos was released worldwide to positive reviews and it received various "album of the month" awards. For 2014, there was an announcement for a European Tour called "Trolls in the Forest bring Kaos over Europe", together with Trollfest and Cryptic Forest.

Mach Dich Frei, #YØLØ and Zerfall (2015-present) 
In early 2015 Finsterforst released their new studio album Mach Dich Frei. It was released on 23 January in Germany/Austria/Switzerland, 30 January in the rest of Europe and on 10 February in North America. Also in 2015, vocalist and accordionist Johannes Joseph left the band.

In 2016, they released #YØLØ, which they refer to as an EP although they recognise some would call it an album.

On 2 August 2019, they released the album Zerfall. It has only five songs, ranging from 8 to 36 minutes – the latter being their longest track to date, "Ecce Homo". A lyric video for a shortened version of it was released in July 2019.

Band members 

 Simon Schillinger – guitars (lead, rhythm, acoustic), keyboards, orchestrations, programming, vocals (choirs) (2004–present)
 Tobias Weinreich – bass (2004–present)
 Sebastian "AlleyJazz" Scherrer – keyboards (2004–present)
 David Schuldis – guitars (rhythm), bagpipes (2005–present)
 Cornelius "Wombo" Heck – drums, vocals (choirs) (2006–present)
 Oliver Berlin – lead and choir vocals (2010–present)

Former
 Marco Schomas – lead vocals, acoustic guitar (2004–2009)
 Johannes Joseph – accordion, vocals (lead, choirs) (2005–2015)

Timeline

Discography

EPs
 Wiege der Finsternis (2005)

#YØLØ (2016) 
The effort is intended to be a humorous approach to the pagan metal genre and its title is the name of a Nordic deity that vocalist Oliver Berlin envisioned. The EP has four covers of songs originally by Miley Cyrus, Michael Jackson, K.I.Z and Die Kassierer.

Most songs discuss drinking, but some cover other topics, such as "Auf die Zwölf", which is about football. A video was shot for the latter, featuring vocalist Robse from Equilibrium.

Track listing

Studio albums
 Weltenkraft (2007)
 ...zum Tode hin (2009)
...zum Tode hin track listing

 Rastlos (2012)
Rastlos track listing

 Mach Dich Frei (2015)
Mach Dich Frei track listing

 Zerfall (2019)

Compilation albums
 Urwerk (2010)

Cryptic Forest

Cryptic Forest history (2003-2014) 
In the beginning, in 2003, the band was only a one-man project by composer Simon Schillinger. A couple of songs came to life, but the project was later put "on ice" because Schillinger's writing focus was resting on his other band Finsterforst at the time. Although Cryptic Forest was officially not active, from time to time he wrote some music unrelated to Finsterforst and shared it with a couple of his friends, who should later encourage him to found a band and to record a short EP. The EP called Dawn of the eclipse was released in 2011, which can be seen as the band's official founding. In August 2013, the debut album Ystyr was released on the German label Einheit Produktionen and a European Tour together with Trollfest and Finsterforst was announced for 2014.

Cryptic Forest discography 

 Dawn of the eclipse (2011; extended play)
 Ystyr (2013)

Concert tours

See also 

 List of folk-metal bands
 List of Napalm Records artists
 Music of Germany

References

Other sources
"Finterforst". Metal Storm. Retrieved 7 February 2013.
"Finterforst Rastlos".  Metalreviews.com.  Retrieved 7 February 2012.

External links

 
 

2004 establishments in Germany
German folk metal musical groups
Musical groups established in 2004
Musical groups from Baden-Württemberg
Napalm Records artists